Willy Sneyers (born 24 February 1950) is a Belgian former equestrian. He competed in two events at the 1992 Summer Olympics.

References

External links
 

1950 births
Living people
Belgian male equestrians
Olympic equestrians of Belgium
Equestrians at the 1992 Summer Olympics
People from Diest
Sportspeople from Flemish Brabant